Horsfield's tarsier (Cephalopachus bancanus), also known as the western tarsier, is the only species of tarsier in the genus Cephalopachus. Named for American naturalist Thomas Horsfield, it occurs on Borneo, Sumatra and nearby islands and is, like other members of the group, entirely nocturnal.

Taxonomy
Although Horsfield's tarsier was usually placed in the genus Tarsius with all other living tarsiers, it is quite distinct from the Philippine tarsier and the various tarsiers of Sulawesi and nearby islands; therefore, scientists have placed it in a separate genus, Cephalopachus.

The taxonomy of this species is in doubt, with some subspecies considered unsure. In fact, over 20 years few studies have been done on C. bancanus and a taxonomic revision based upon intensive and systematic field surveys is overdue. The IUCN believes that these subspecies should be treated as distinct and named as separate taxa until more definitive evidence is available. When splitting the species into its own genus, Colin Groves and Myron Shekelle recognized the natunensis population as a distinct subspecies.

There are four recognized subspecies of Horfield's tarsier:
 Cephalopachus bancanus bancanus
 Cephalopachus bancanus saltator — Belitung Island tarsier
 Cephalopachus bancanus borneanus — Bornean tarsier
 Cephalopachus bancanus natunensis — Natuna Islands tarsier

Physical description

The pelage coloration ranges from pale-olive or reddish brown to pale or dark grey-brown, possibly varying with age. Based on 12 collected specimens, the range measurement from head to body is 121–154 mm. Horsfield's tarsier has an extremely long tail which can reach 181 to 224 mm and is hairless except for tufts of hair at the end. This species has two grooming claws on each foot. The fingers are very long and have pads on the tips. The toes have flattened nails except for the second and third toes on hind feet, which bear claw-like nails. It has large eyes which do not reflect light. The membranous ears are slender and almost bare. The molars of this species have high-cusps and are almost tritubercular. The dental formula of Horsfield's tarsier is 2:1:3:3 on the upper jaw and 1:1:3:3 on the lower jaw.

Habitat and distribution

Horsfield's tarsier is found in Southern Sumatra, Borneo and nearby islands. The Bornean subspecies, C. b. borneanus, is known from many lowland sites in Sabah, Brunei, Sarawak and West Kalimantan and above 900m in the Kelabit uplands in Northern Sarawak. Other records show it from Kutai and Peleben in East Kalimantan and Tanjung Maruwe in Central Kalimantan. This species can live in both primary and secondary forests, and it also lives in forests along the coasts or on the edge of plantations.

Behaviour and ecology

Horsfield's tarsier is a nocturnal species. It sleeps alone during the day in a tangle of vines or creepers at a height of 3.5 to 5 meters. This species prefers to sleep, rest, or remain stationary on perches that are angled 5 degrees from the vertical tree trunks, 1 to 4 cm in diameter, and it sleeps solitarily. Before sunset, Horsfield's tarsier will wake up and wait 10 to 20 minutes before moving around the understory and spending 1.5 to 2 hours of the night foraging for food. Horsfield's tarsier can be found from ground level up to a height of 7m or more in the understory.

This species is carnivorous. It mainly eats insects such as beetles, grasshoppers, katydids, cockroaches, butterflies, moths, praying mantis, ants, phasmids, and cicadas, but also will eat small vertebrates such as bats (Chiroptera) including members of the genus Taphozous, the lesser short-nosed fruit bat (Cynopterus brachyotis), and the spotted-winged fruit bat (Balionycteris maculata), and snakes, of which poisonous snakes have been found to be consumed. For example, the poisonous snake Maticora intestinalis was found to be hunted for by this species. This species was also found to consume birds, including: spiderhunters, warblers, kingfishers, and pittas. It locates prey primarily by sound and catches the prey with its hands when foraging. The prey items get killed by bites to the back of the neck and the eyes are shut when attacking. It will consume the prey starting with the head and working its way down the body. This species gets water both by drinking from a pool or stream, and by licking drops from bamboo leaves or from trunks of trees when water is running down the bark. Horsfield's tarsier is a host of the acanthocephalan intestinal parasite Moniliformis tarsii.

Horsfield's tarsier, like all tarsiers, is a vertical clinger and leaper known for its extraordinary leaping abilities. An individual will mainly support itself with its feet and the tail exerts enough force to hold the individual in place without using the hands much because of the pads located on the feet. Except when resting, the hands are usually placed no higher than its nose. The hands are only placed higher up to maintain the position of the individual. Other modes of locomotion used by the species include climbing, quadrupedal walking, hopping and "cantilevering."

Horsfield's tarsier is monogamous, with a copulation frequency during estrus of once per night. Courtship calls are performed by the male and he emits 2-3 chirrups while opening and closing the mouth. This call happens within 5 minutes of looking at the female. Once the male gives his courtship call, if the female is receptive, she will perform genital displays to him. If the female is not in estrus, she will emit an agonistic call which is often followed by biting and pushing the male away. Both sexes' calls last on average for 1 second, and the interval between calls is on average 3 seconds.

Infants are born with their eyes open and fully furred and are able to groom themselves. The mother will carry her infant in her mouth and when she forages for food the mother will park the infant on a branch. Infant sounds are mostly clicks: "k", "tk", "ki", or a rapid "kooih" and can be heard when the infant is left alone or is cold. The mother stays in contact with their infants using high-pitched calls. Infants were found to first use the tails as support during resting at 7–10 days. Young leave their range at the onset of puberty, and find their own territory.

Social grooming in this species only occurs between mothers and infants, removing dead skin and parasites by scratching with their toe claws and licking their fur, avoiding their faces. Faces are cleaned by rubbing on branches and it is to reinforce social bonds.

Horsfield's tarsier marks its territory with scents from urine and glandular secretions on a substrate while scratching the surface with its hind-limb toe claws.

Conservation status

The rapid loss of habitat due to forest conversion, oil palm plantations, fire and logging is cause for concern. Additionally, the species is also collected for the illegal pet trade and wrongly considered a pest to agricultural crops.  It can suffer, directly and indirectly, from the use of agricultural pesticides.

Horsfield's tarsier is listed as vulnerable in the 2008 IUCN Red List of Threatened Species, listed in CITES Appendix II, and protected by law in Indonesia and in Malaysia.

Environmental group WWF was particularly active in the establishment of the protected area. In the "Heart of Borneo" project, non-governmental organizations (NGOs) have played a role in promoting the critical initiative and in assisting the transboundary nations in its conceptualization, design, and implementation. The transboundary nations are to improve biodiversity conservation in Bornean production forests, and to ensure that such forests are not simply converted to agricultural land-uses such as oil-palm plantations after logging.

References

External links

Horsfield's tarsier
Primates of Indonesia
Mammals of Borneo
Mammals of Brunei
Mammals of Malaysia
Vulnerable fauna of Asia
Horsfield's tarsier
Taxa named by Thomas Horsfield